SS Minnesota was an American built ocean-liner operated by the Great Northern Steamship Company which was owned by James J. Hill. From 27 February 1919 until 15 September 1919 the ship was commissioned as USS Troy for U.S. naval service. Both ships built in 1903 were the largest and most luxurious liners built in the United States at the opening of the 20th century. The passenger telephone system, another was installed for ship's use, was advertised by the manufacturer, Electric Gas Lighting Company of Boston, to be the largest shipboard installation.

Minnesota was sold in January 1917 to the Atlantic Transport Company of West Virginia, part of J. P. Morgan's International Mercantile Marine Company, reaching New York in March where she was armed in accordance with measures authorized for merchant ships and received a U.S. Navy armed guard gun crew. The ship was in English waters when the United States declared war and made seven wartime round trips. During one of the New York port calls the ship was inspected and accepted for U.S. Navy use assigned the identification number 1614 until the end of hostilities whereupon the armament and naval personnel were removed. 

The Navy chartered Minnesota to bring troops home, renamed the ship Troy and placed her in commission at the Army's Bush Terminal in Brooklyn, N.Y., on 27 February 1919 under the command of Lt. Comdr. Thomas W. Garlick, USNRF. Troy departed 9 May 1919 in the first of a series of voyages until decommissioned on 15 September 1919, returned to her owners and regaining the name Minnesota. The ship was converted for oil use but never operated again at sea. During the  flu pandemic the ship was operated as a floating isolation hospital in New York.

She was scrapped in 1923.

References

External links
flag-draped SS Minnesota in Puget Sound, Washington
 SS Minnesota and her sister ship SS Dakota at Smith Cove Pier, Seattle around 1906 (Magnolia Historical Society)[WaybackMachine]
Photo: Mitsubishi Dockyard & Engine Works, No. 3 Dock with SS Minnesota (Marine Engineer and Naval Architect, October 1910)
Photo: Coaling the S.S. MINNESOTA in Japan with a small army of laborers. A stop on the way out to the Philippines (NOAA's Historic Coast & Geodetic Survey (C&GS) Collection)[WaybackMachine]
postcards featuring SS Minnesota: #1, ..#2, ..#3

Ships built in New London, Connecticut
1903 ships
Steamships of the United States
Passenger ships of the United States
Troop ships of the United States